Gemma Modinos, born 1980 in Castellar del Vallès, is a Spanish neuropsychologist. She works as a Reader of Neuroscience and Mental Health at the Institute of Psychiatry, Psychology and Neuroscience of King's College London. She is a Sir Henry Dale Fellow and a Group leader at the MRC centre for Neurodevelopmental Disorders  at King's College London. She is the Chair of the Young Academy of Europe, where she directs European efforts to optimise science policy from a youthful perspective; and Junior Member of the Executive Board of the Schizophrenia International Research Society. She is known for her work revealing the role of emotion-related brain mechanisms in the development of psychosis and investigating how targeting these mechanisms can help design new therapeutic strategies.

Early life
She earned a BSc in Psychology at the Autonomous University of Barcelona, followed by an MSc in Applied Neurosciences at the University of Barcelona (Spain) while she worked as clinical neuropsychologist at Fundació ACE. She then moved to the Netherlands to do a PhD in Neuroscience at the University of Groningen. She performed her post-doctoral training at the Department of Psychosis Studies at the Institute of Psychiatry, Psychology and Neuroscience (IoPPN), King’s College London.

Career 
In 2013, Modinos received a Brain & Behavior Research Foundation Young Investigator Award to examine the relationship between functional MRI activation during emotion processing and glutamate levels in healthy people with high schizotypy. In 2016, she was awarded a King’s Prize Fellowship  and a Wellcome Trust & Royal Society Sir Henry Dale Fellowship, allowing her to open her own lab at IoPPN. She is a Reader in Neuroscience & Mental Health in the Departments of Psychosis Studies and Neuroimaging at the IoPPN.

Top 5 publications
 Modinos et al. (2020) Association of Adverse Outcomes With Emotion Processing and Its Neural Substrate in Individuals at Clinical High Risk for Psychosis. JAMA Psychiatry. 2020;77(2):190-200.

 Modinos et al. (2018) Prefrontal GABA levels, hippocampal resting perfusion and the risk of psychosis. Neuropsychopharmacology. 2018;43:2652–2659.

 Modinos et al. (2017) Corticolimbic hyper-response to emotion and glutamatergic function in people with high schizotypy: a multimodal fMRI-MRS study. Translational Psychiatry. 2017;7:e1083.

 Modinos, Paul Allen, Anthony A. Grace, Philip McGuire (2015) Translating the MAM Model of Psychosis to Humans. Trends in Neurosciences. 2015;38(3):129-138.

 Modinos, Johan Ormel, André Aleman (2010). Individual differences in dispositional mindfulness and brain activity involved in reappraisal of emotion. Social Cognitive and Affective Neuroscience, 5(4);369-377.

References

External links 
 www.modinoslab.com
 her official labpage
 Google scholar page with her work

1980 births
Living people
Spanish neuroscientists

Autonomous University of Barcelona alumni
University of Groningen alumni
Academics of King's College London